Rantz is a surname of German origin. Notable people with the surname include:

Jim Rantz (born 1938), American baseball player and executive
Joe Rantz (1914–2007), American rower

References

Surnames of German origin